Safara may refer to:

1364 Safara, a minor planet
Safara Monastery or Sapara Monastery, a?religious monastery in the Republic of Georgia